Mai Martinez (born December 16, 1973) is an American news anchor and reporter. She is the co-anchor of the morning news on WBBM (AM) Newsradio 780 AM and 105.9 FM, with Cisco Cotto. She is a reporter for the all-news radio station.

Early life and education 

A native of San Francisco, Martinez earned a bachelor's degree in 1997 from Jacksonville State University in Jacksonville, Alabama. 
She is of half Cuban and half Vietnamese descent.

Professional career 

Martinez began her broadcasting career as a video editor at WBRC-TV in Birmingham, Alabama, where she worked from 1997 until 2003.  In 2000, she co-hosted a morning radio show on WOXR-FM in Oxford, Alabama.   In 2003, Martinez became a photographer, general assignment reporter and fill-in anchor at WDSI-TV in Chattanooga, Tennessee.  She then rejoined WBRC-TV in April 2004 as a general assignment reporter and fill-in anchor.  While there, Martinez developed a higher level of national visibility when she spent eight weeks in Aruba covering the disappearance of Natalee Holloway. 
In May 2006, Martinez was hired by WBBM-TV in Chicago as a general assignment reporter.  On September 20, 2007, she was promoted to be a weekend news anchor at the station. Martinez was laid off on May 27, 2020. On March 28, 2022, WBBM (AM) announced that Martinez has been hired to co-anchor the morning news starting April 4, 2022, with Cisco Cotto from 6-9 AM, she will also report stories from the field for WBBM Newsradio.

Personal 
She is single and lives in the Uptown neighborhood on Chicago's North Side.

References

External links 
 WBBM-TV Profile

Living people
Television anchors from Chicago
American television reporters and correspondents
1973 births
American people of Cuban descent
American people of Vietnamese descent